"The Magical Delights of Stevie Nicks" is the tenth episode of the third season of the anthology television series American Horror Story, which  premiered on January 8, 2014, on the cable network FX. The episode was written by James Wong and directed by Alfonso Gomez-Rejon. In this episode, Fiona (Jessica Lange) tries to out the next Supreme with a visit by Stevie Nicks and Madison (Emma Roberts) tries to eliminate her competition for the Supremacy. This episode marks Nicks' acting debut. She agreed to do the show based on her love of Glee, another show from the same creative team. Angela Bassett, Danny Huston and Patti LuPone guest star as Marie Laveau, the Axeman, and Joan Ramsey, respectively. This episode is rated TV-MA (LV).

Plot

Misty Day is overwhelmed when presented to Stevie Nicks, who gives away her trademark shawl to Misty as a lucky charm for the Seven Wonders trial. 

Marie Laveau reveals to Fiona the source of her immortality: "to sell the soul to Papa Legba and obey his commands no matter what once a year", which in Marie's case is to get him an innocent life starting with her own baby centuries ago.

Madison tries to sabotage Zoe and the other witches in the race for the Supremacy.

Cordelia breaks down, feeling useless and responsible for the impending war and begins destroying the greenhouse. Shortly after, the Delphi Trust, losing half of their finances in less than 10 minutes, suspects witchcraft influence and starts planning the extermination of the Coven. Fiona summons Papa Legba, offering her soul in exchange for eternal youth and willing to do any request for it, but the spirit turns down the deal as he claims she has "no soul to give". After this, she becomes determined to kill all of the Coven in order to murder the new Supreme.

Marie and Fiona decide to get rid of Nan, considering her too dangerous after she finds the stolen newborn for Papa Legba and starts claiming she would be a better and kinder Supreme. They offer her as a sacrifice to Papa Legba, drowning her in the bathtub. He accepts the substitute for the newborn and warns Laveau and Fiona of being "trouble" together.

Reception
Rotten Tomatoes reports a 77% approval rating, based on 13 reviews. The critical consensus reads, "The titular rock star provides grounding for "The Magical Delights of Stevie Nicks", an enjoyably odd episode that becomes bolder as it progresses, even if the characters and storylines grow more difficult to track." Emily VanDerWerff of The A.V. Club gave the episode an A− rating, saying, ""The Magical Delights of Stevie Nicks" is by far the best episode of this season of American Horror Story. Freed from the constraints of its endless circling and with an actual villain to face off with, the show's characters start actually doing stuff, and the series' momentum grows exponentially." However, she added: "It's also a completely ridiculous episode of television." Matt Fowler from IGN gave the episode a 7.3/10 rating, saying, "While offering up a handful of surprising moments, "The Magical Delights of Stevie Nicks" was still Coven weakest entry. The sick and depraved danger fell by the wayside, replaced with soap-y Supreme competitiveness."

The episode received a 1.8 18–49 ratings share and was watched by 3.49 million viewers in its original American broadcast, a decrease from the previous episode.

References

External links

 
 "The Magical Delights of Stevie Nicks" at TV Guide.com

2014 American television episodes
American Horror Story: Coven episodes
Stevie Nicks
Filicide in fiction